The Dirty Dozen: The Deadly Mission is a 1987 made-for-TV film and is the second sequel to the original The Dirty Dozen. It features an all-new 'dirty dozen,' this time under the leadership of Major Wright (Telly Savalas, playing a different role than in the 1967 film).

Learning of a Nazi plot to attack Washington, D.C. with a deadly nerve gas, Major Wright leads twelve convicts on a suicide mission deep into occupied France to destroy the secret factory where the poison is made.

Plot

Opening
The film opens with Major Wright fighting alongside Italian partisans in a town near Turin. While the partisans battle the occupying German soldiers in the streets, Major Wright enters a bordello in search of Benito Mussolini. However, after shooting up a closet only to find a dead German officer, Wright is informed by one of the women that 'Il Duce' had already left town. Disappointed, Major Wright opens the window to the sound of the victorious partisans and lifts a glass of brandy to "Franklin Delano Roosevelt and Winston Spencer Churchill."

Back in England, Major Wright is summoned to the U.S. Army Headquarters by Major General Worden (Ernest Borgnine), and is informed that the Germans appear to have the capability to launch (fictional) A4 missiles with warheads filled with deadly nerve gas to strike targets in the British Isles and, possibly, the United States. General Worden then orders Major Wright to "find another dirty dozen" and take them deep into occupied France to the monastery at Saint-Michel, where six captured scientists are being forced by the Nazis under the direction of the SS Colonel Krieger (Wolf Kahler) to produce the deadly gas, and destroy the containers of nerve gas and rescue the scientists.

Training
This time around the dozen only have one week of training, and with the help of Sergeant Holt, Major Wright begins whipping his men into shape.

Meanwhile, in France, Colonel Krieger captures French Resistance leader Paul Verlaine and his British contact, who had parachuted in with news of the forthcoming mission. After Krieger has the two men executed, Pierre Claudel, a scientist at the monastery loyal to Vichy and the Nazis, identifies Verlaine as the man who has been seen at the monastery conversing with lead scientist, George Flamands. A suspicious Krieger orders increased security at the monastery.

Back in England, General Worden appears at the training site and reveals the intelligence leak and increased security to Major Wright, and informs him that the dozen will now enter France by sea instead of air, as all flights into that section of France were being heavily monitored.

As their training comes to an end, Major Wright throws a party for his men, giving them one last night of debauchery before embarking on their suicide mission.

Mission
Upon coming ashore, the dirty dozen march to their rendezvous point in the French forest, where they meet their contact, Marie Verlaine, the daughter of Paul Verlaine, and her fellow resistance fighters. Marie informs Major Wright that the scientists' families have been brought to the monastery, thus complicating the rescue portion of the mission.

To avoid Krieger's patrols and checkpoints, Major Wright decides that they should travel by river, and the dozen attacks a German patrol boat, successfully taking control of the boat with only one casualty, Sturdivant. From here, the dozen travel down the river, eventually making their way to a Resistance farmhouse, where the men are allowed to rest, while Major Wright and Fontenac go to the monastery dressed as monks to meet with Flamands and inform him of their plans.

One night Fontenac attempts to rape Marie, until he is caught by Stern and Wallan, Wallan pins him to the wall and tells him "You move and I will cut your throat out." Stern however suggests to leave it with Major Wright, but Wallan wants to finish off Fontenac himself, Marie soon finds out that the Dozen are really criminals, Marie asks Wright why they are murders and psychopathic criminals in the US army, as Wright tells the story, Marie states that after the mission she will kill Fontenac herself.

Later that night, Wright and Fontenac re-enter the monastery to trigger the attack from the inside, while the others infiltrate the monastery compound. Wright and Fontenac are followed by the SS sergeant from the gate after the sergeant became suspicious when Fontenac called him by his rank. After being confronted, the major shoots the sergeant and the gunfire starts the attack proper.

While the dozen battle the German troops in the monastery's courtyard, Major Wright destroys the communications center, Stern makes his way into the basement and Fontenac opens the back door allowing Marie, Swede, Martinez and the Resistance men in with the explosives however Fontenac attempts to escape and flee to Spain but Swede prevents this from happening and tells him he will shoot him if he tries to escape, Fontenac follows orders in the end, Wright then heads back out into the courtyard, where, he, Sergeant Holt, the Webber brothers, Spencer and Kelly secure the area, while Ballews and Chacon give covering fire from the balcony, as Marie and Martinez set the incendiary fuses, accidentally igniting the chemicals, which eventually causes an explosion.

As the multiple groups meet up, Ferucci is wounded in the shoulder while Chacon and Spencer are killed in the courtyard. The group then proceeds to the scientists' living quarters, where they find not only the scientists and their wives, but also Fredric Flamands, George Flamands son, and also their family's children as well. The group is also notified that Flamands and his wife Julia have been taken to a Wagner recital at a villa as guests of a German general. Major Wright decides to take everyone with them, and that he and Stern must head to the villa to rescue the Flamands. The scientists and their families are boarded into a truck and head to the spot where a British plane is to pick everyone up. Major Wright sends this truck on a back road while sending two decoy trucks driven by Martinez, Ballews and the Webber brothers on the main roads.

Major Wright and Stern, posing as German officers, enter the villa and remove Flamands and his wife despite being confronted by Pierre Claudel (who was quickly subdued by George Flamands), and in a German staff car head to the rendezvous point.

German patrols stop the two decoy trucks and destroy them, both the Webber Brothers, Martinez and Ballews are all killed. Realizing they have been tricked, Krieger and his men race to the area where the plane has landed and begin firing upon it, as the scientists and their families are being loaded. Fredric panics and calls out for his mother and father, however Fontenac managed to carry him to safety but a mortar shell hits Fontenac and knocks Fredric to the ground and also wounding Fontenac, also Wallan manages to save Fredric in time, and Kelly as well, Fontenac tells Major Wright that it "doesn't look like I'll make it home," he sacrifices himself by manning a machine gun and drawing the fire of the approaching patrols, giving the plane enough time to be boarded and take-off despite coming under heavy fire. The weary soldiers, and the scientists and their families all breathe heavy sighs of relief as the plane embarks on its trip back to England.

Besides Major Wright and Sergeant Holt, the surviving members of the 'dirty dozen' include Joe Stern, Eric 'Swede' Wallan, Ernesto 'Pops' Ferucci and Francis Kelly, who earn their freedom.

Cast
 Telly Savalas as Major Wright
 Ernest Borgnine as Major General Sam Worden
 Vince Edwards as Sergeant Holt
 Bo Svenson as Maurice Fontenac
 Vincent Van Patten as Ronald Webber
 James Van Patten as David Webber
 Randall "Tex" Cobb as Eric "Swede" Wallan
 Gary Graham as Joseph Stern
 Wolf Kahler as Colonel Krieger
 Thom Mathews as Francis Kelly
 Emmanuelle Meyssignac as Marie Verlaine
 Paul Picerni as Ernesto "Pops" Ferucci
 Branko Blaće as Martinez
 Bernard Woringer as Georges Flamands
 David Horovitch as Pierre Claudel
 Pavle Balenović as Ballews
 Matko Raguž as Sturdivant
 Mario Barbarić as Chacon
 Milan Ristić as Spencer
 Sam Douglas as Hallet
 Werner Stocker as SS Sergeant
 Vili Matula as Krieger's Aide
 Ivo Krištof as Lieutenant Karl Hoffler
 Božidar Smiljanić as Paul Verlaine
 Meg Wynn Owen as Julia Flamands 
 Jay Bura as Fredric Flamands, Georges's Son

The New Dozen
 Joe Stern (Gary Graham) - sentenced to death by hanging for drunkenly (Stern claims he wasn't drunk) killing an Englishman in a bar; Stern is a Jewish refugee from Germany with a history of petty theft and gun smuggling. Joe Stern also isn't his real name, but his real name isn't important as "everyone who had it is probably dead."
 Eric "Swede" Wallan (Randall 'Tex' Cobb) - sentenced to death by hanging; killed two British citizens who tried to rob him by crushing their skulls with his bare hands.
 Ernesto "Pops" Ferucci (Paul Picerni) - sentenced to 20 years of hard labor; Ferucci is a 52-year-old forger, as Wright calls him, "a one-man black market".
 Ronald Webber and David Webber (Vincent Van Patten and James Van Patten) – both sentenced to 30 years of imprisonment; the Webber brothers are ex-race-car drivers turned 'auto thieves and killers.'
 Maurice Fontenac (Bo Svenson) – sentenced to death by hanging; raped and murdered a WAC; a Frenchman whose ability to speak fluent French makes him indispensable to Major Wright and the mission despite his volatile and psychotic personality.
 Martinez (Branko Blaće) – sentenced to 50 years imprisonment; a bank robber and explosives expert.
 The remaining five of the dozen are Francis Kelly (Thom Mathews), Ballews (Pavle Balenović), Sturdivant (Matko Raguž), Chacon (Mario Barbarić) and Spencer (Milan Ristić), who, with the exception of Kelly, receive little-to-no screen time. A 13th member, Hallet (Sam Douglas), is recruited, but only 12 are to go on the mission. The choice of who goes back to prison is made easy when Hallet panics during a training exercise at the live ammunition course and is accidentally killed.

References

External links
 
 
 

1987 television films
1987 films
1980s English-language films
American action television films
Films directed by Lee H. Katzin
Films shot in Croatia
Italian Campaign of World War II films
Television sequel films
War adventure films
World War II films based on actual events
American World War II films
Films about the United States Army
1980s American films
World War II television films